"Good Tradition" is a song, written and originally recorded by British pop/folk singer-songwriter Tanita Tikaram, released as the first single from her debut album, Ancient Heart (1988). When it was released, it went largely unnoticed and attracted little media attention. The song therefore did not get much airplay, but weeks after its release, the single started climbing up the charts and finally reached #10 at the UK Singles Chart in August 1988.

Background
To celebrate, WEA records released a limited edition design by Tikaram in which she tells the brief story of the song, the song's success on the charts, and thanks everyone that supported the song. In the design Tikaram notes each Sunday week ending date from the first week of single release, alongside its position on the UK Singles Chart for that week in question. The positions noted by Tikaram are 149-163-80-67-36-23-15-10, all up to the point the single made the top 10.

At the time of compiling the charts, Gallup only had around 3,000 record stores connected to their EPOS (electronic point of sale) system and estimated the rest of the country's shops on an average basis compared to sales in those registered. Tikaram did indeed enter the UK Top 40 singles chart at #36 as broadcast on 31 July 1988 by Bruno Brookes on BBC Radio 1's Live Chart Countdown and on BBC1's live broadcast of Top of The Pops on 4 August 1988.

In recent years, the Official Charts Company have revised historical charts due to more precise data and record sales being available. "Good Tradition" now shows as entering at #39. The rest of its chart run has been unaffected.

Critical reception
Pan-European magazine Music & Media wrote, "An up-tempo country-tinged number by this 'exciting new-comer. Her voice is strong, full of personality and has the same sort of deadpan quality as Chrissie Hynde."

Music video
The accompanying music video for "Good Tradition" features Tikaram playing in front of judges at an audition, following on from an unsuccessful auditionee. At first shy, Tikaram strikes a couple of notes and the song begins and, as it develops, the judges and the crew from the theatre start dancing to the tune. At the end Tikaram is shown smiling.

Charts

Cover versions
With lyrics in Swedish by Keith Almgren, the song was covered by Kikki Danielsson & Roosarna on the 1990 album På lugnare vatten as I god tradition ("In good tradition").

References

1988 debut singles
Tanita Tikaram songs
Songs written by Tanita Tikaram
Warner Music Group singles
1988 songs
Song recordings produced by Rod Argent